Pedro E. Diaz High School or simply PEDHS is a public secondary school in the Philippines. It is situated in U.P. Side Subdivision, Alabang, Muntinlupa.

History
Pedro E. Diaz High School was first known as Annex of Fort Bonifacio College (FBC) situated at Soldiers Hills Village, Putatan, City of Muntinlupa. Due to Financial and Administrative problems, on February, 1980, the PTA passed the resolution converting the school into Muntinlupa Municipal High School into Pedro E. Diaz High School, which the late Mayor Maximiano Argana and the School Division Superintendent Bienvenido Espiritu approved.

Again, on December 2, 1991, Muntinlupa Mayor Ignacio R. Bunye and the Sanguniang Bayan member signed Resolution No. 91-233 renaming Muntinlupa Municipal High School into Pedro E. Diaz High School in honor and tribute to Hon. Pedro Espeleta Diaz, a former Mayor of his town, who was brutally killed by the Japanese during his term in defense of his townmates.

Disaster and Risk Reduction Management
The schools "Batang Emergency Response Team" (BERT) won several awards in the regional level from the DRRM.

A school building was abandoned due to it being above the Marikina Valley Fault System.

See also
List of schools in Muntinlupa

References

Schools in Muntinlupa
High schools in Metro Manila
1977 establishments in the Philippines
Educational institutions established in 1977

tl:Pedro E. Diaz High School